Abrytasites (Abrytusites) is an extinct genus of cephalopods belonging to the Ammonoidea subclass. The genus was named after the ancient Roman town of Abrittus, located near the present Bulgarian city of Razgrad. There are several described species of Abrytasites, including A. thieuloyi, A. julianyi, and A. neumayri. They are inflated, with constrictions, have rather thick ribs  springing irregularly, singly or in pairs, from umbilical bullae. Their inner whorls closely resemble types species of Valdedorsella. This animal lived 125–136.4 million years ago during the Hauterivian and the Barremian in  Europe and western Africa.

See also 
 List of ammonite genera

References

External links

  
 Abrytusites at ZipcodeZoo, 19 April 2012
 Abrytusites at Sepkoski's Online Genus Database, 21 April 2012.
 
 

Early Cretaceous ammonites of Europe
Ammonitida genera
Desmoceratidae
Hauterivian genus first appearances
Early Cretaceous genus extinctions